The Château de Monte-Cristo is a writer's house museum located at Le Port-Marly in the Yvelines department of northern France. It was originally built as a residence for Alexandre Dumas, père.

History 
The château was designed by the architect Hippolyte Durand and built between 1844 and 1847. Dumas named it after one of his most successful novels, The Count of Monte Cristo (French: Le Comte de Monte-Cristo), which was completed in 1844.

Durand also designed a writing studio on the grounds, which Dumas named the Château d'If after another setting from the same novel. In 1848, short of money, Dumas had to sell the property.

The château fell into disrepair by the 1960s. It was later restored with the patronage of King Hassan II of Morocco, who financed the restoration of its Moorish room. Since 1994, the two châteaux and gardens have been restored. The entire property is operated as a public historic museum memorializing Dumas.

Gallery

External links 
 Official website
 Château de Monte-Cristo – Société des amis d'Alexandre Dumas (in French)

Chateau de Monte-Cristo
Châteaux in Yvelines
Houses completed in 1846
Historic house museums in Île-de-France
Literary museums in France
Museums in Yvelines
Tourist attractions in Yvelines
Maisons des Illustres